Daniil Alekseyevich Agureyev (born 23 February 1999) is a Russian football player. He plays for FC Luki-Energiya Velikiye Luki.

Club career
He made his debut in the Russian Football National League for FC Dynamo Bryansk on 12 August 2020 in a game against FC Nizhny Novgorod.

References

External links
 
 Profile by Russian Football National League
 

1999 births
Sportspeople from Novgorod Oblast
People from Veliky Novgorod
Living people
Russian footballers
Association football forwards
FC Dynamo Bryansk players